{{Speciesbox
|name = 
|image = Scaevola gaudichaudiana (5188529688).jpg
|genus = Scaevola (plant)
|species = gaudichaudiana
|authority = Cham.
|synonyms = Scaevola ciliata G.Don
Scaevola kahanae O.Deg.
Scaevola ligustrifolia Nutt.
Scaevola pubescens Nutt.Scaevola skottsbergii H.St.JohnTemminckia ciliata (G.Don) de Vriese
|synonyms_ref = 
}}Scaevola gaudichaudiana, the mountain naupaka, is a perennial shrub in the family Goodeniaceae.  
The plant is endemic to Hawaii.

It was first described by Adelbert von Chamisso in 1832 in the journal Linnaea and was given the specific epithet, gaudichaudiana, to honour Charles Gaudichaud-Beaupré.

DescriptionScaevola gaudichaudiana'' flowers all year round and its flowers are fragrant, white, and tubular. Flowering is followed by small purple fruits. The margins of the leaves are toothed.

References

External links

gaudichaudiana
Endemic flora of Hawaii
Taxa named by Adelbert von Chamisso
Plants described in 1833
Flora without expected TNC conservation status